Edna Tildesley Hughes (1 August 1916 – 17 November 1990), later known by her married name Edna Redwood, was an English competition swimmer who represented Great Britain in the 1932 Summer Olympics and 1936 Summer Olympics.

She was born in Walsall and died in Ceredigion.

In the 1932 Olympics she won bronze medal in the 4×100 m freestyle relay event. She was also fourth in her first round heat of 100 m freestyle event and did not advance.

Four years later she was sixth in the 4×100 m freestyle relay event.

See also
 List of Olympic medalists in swimming (women)

External links
Edna Hughes' profile at Sports Reference.com

1916 births
1990 deaths
Sportspeople from Walsall
English female swimmers
English female freestyle swimmers
Olympic swimmers of Great Britain
Swimmers at the 1932 Summer Olympics
Swimmers at the 1936 Summer Olympics
Olympic bronze medallists for Great Britain
Swimmers at the 1934 British Empire Games
Swimmers at the 1938 British Empire Games
Commonwealth Games silver medallists for England
Commonwealth Games bronze medallists for England
Olympic bronze medalists in swimming
European Aquatics Championships medalists in swimming
Medalists at the 1932 Summer Olympics
Commonwealth Games medallists in swimming
20th-century English women
Medallists at the 1934 British Empire Games
Medallists at the 1938 British Empire Games